U.S. Route 5 (US 5) is a north–south United States Numbered Highway extending from southern Connecticut to the northernmost part of Vermont. In Massachusetts, the route travels , paralleling the Connecticut River and Interstate 91 (I-91) through Hampden, Hampshire, and Franklin counties.

Route description
US 5 stays very close to the Connecticut River and I-91. It enters the state at the town of Longmeadow on the east bank of the river going up to Springfield. The freeway portion travels for about  up to West Springfield. US 5 also passes through Holyoke, Hatfield, Whately, Deerfield, and Greenfield. As in Connecticut and Vermont, US 5 has many interchanges with the parallel I-91.

History

Major intersections

See also

References

External links

05
 Massachusetts
Transportation in Hampden County, Massachusetts
Transportation in Hampshire County, Massachusetts
Transportation in Franklin County, Massachusetts